Bernard "Burn" Loeffke (born Bernardo Loeffke Arjona on September 17, 1934 in Barranquilla, Colombia) is a retired major general of the United States Army. He fought and was wounded in the Vietnam War and later served as the commanding general of U.S. Army South. He was awarded four Silver Star Medals, the Distinguished Flying Cross, five Bronze Stars, a Purple Heart and four Air Medals. In the 1980s, he was the first American general to serve in the U.S. embassy in Beijing, as defense attache. He wrote the book China, Our Enemy?, which espouses peaceful relations between the U.S. and China.

Biography 
Loeffke graduated from the United States Military Academy in 1957. He has a B.S. in Engineering, an M.A. in Russian Language and Soviet Area Studies from Middlebury College, and a Ph.D. in International Relations from the University of Miami. His 1978 doctoral thesis was entitled The Latin American military and Soviet perceptions. He taught Russian at the U.S. Military Academy and U.S. Foreign Policy at Georgetown University.

Loeffke was an Army Ranger and a pilot. He commanded Special Forces, an Infantry battalion, and was a paratroop advisor to Vietnamese units during the Vietnam War. He was wounded in Vietnam by Chinese and Vietnamese troops, and received four Silver Stars, five Bronze Stars, and a Purple Heart.

While serving as a junior officer in Vietnam, Loeffke said he was forever changed by the combat death of one of his soldiers, Sergeant Larry Morford. Morford opposed the war, but explained to Loeffke that even during a time of the draft, when his unit was predominantly draftees, he chose to volunteer to be a soldier because "war is a beastly job and the least beastly of us should be doing it." Loeffke dedicated the Friendship Fund at West Point in Morford's honor to inspire cadets to increase their understanding of Russian and Chinese relations. He likened Morford to Chinese corporal Lei Feng, a national icon in China who symbolizes selfless service. During the war, a total of 34 soldiers died under his command and 200 were wounded.

After the Vietnam War, he served as the Army Attaché at the U.S. Embassy in Moscow, a staff officer in the White House, and Director of the Commission on White House Fellows. He visited China for the first time in 1973, and befriended the Chinese general Xu Xin, who had been wounded by American fire during the Korean War. In 1982, Loeffke became the first American general to serve in the U.S. embassy in Beijing, as defense attache. He learned to speak Mandarin in the following three years. Loeffke was also the first foreign soldier to participate in a parachute jump with Chinese airborne troops. His experience in China changed his views about the country, and he began to advocate for the U.S. to treat China as a friend rather than an enemy. In 2012, he published the book China, Our Enemy?, which recounts his 40 years of experiences with China and espouses peaceful relations between the two countries.

Loeffke culminated his military career as the commanding general of U.S. Army South. In 1992, he retired from the military and started his medical career. After finishing his studies as a physician assistant in 1997, he participated in medical missions in war-torn or impoverished areas such as Bosnia, Haiti, Kenya, Iraq, Niger, Darfur and the Amazon jungles. In his view, differing nations perceive and value things differently, and one common language that everyone speaks is health; working to improve the health of a population builds lasting friendships and allies, not enemies.

References 

1934 births
Living people
People from Barranquilla
United States Military Academy alumni
United States Army Rangers
United States Army personnel of the Vietnam War
Recipients of the Air Medal
Recipients of the Distinguished Flying Cross (United States)
Recipients of the Silver Star
Middlebury College alumni
University of Miami alumni
United States Military Academy faculty
Recipients of the Legion of Merit
United States Army generals
United States military attachés
China–United States military relations
Georgetown University faculty
21st-century American non-fiction writers